Imperator Furiosa is a fictional character in the 2015 film Mad Max: Fury Road and the 2024 prequel film Furiosa. She is a war captain under Immortan Joe but turns against him in order to free "The Five Wives", Joe's female concubines (or "breeders").

She meets Max Rockatansky during her journey and, despite initial hostility, the two become allies and team up to drive The Five Wives to a safe environment called The Green Place. Anya Taylor-Joy will play the character in the 2024 film Furiosa where she will serve as the protagonist.

Films

Mad Max: Fury Road

Imperator Furiosa is introduced early in the film during a speech made by Immortan Joe, during which she is shown to work logistics for Joe's citadel, specifically charged with the task of ferrying oil from Gas Town to the Citadel. To expedite the process Furiosa is granted command over a small outfit of Warboys – men who serve as Joe's armed force – and entrusted with the "war rig", a heavily armed and armored tractor-trailer truck complete with a tri-axle tanker trailer capable of towing an additional fuel tank trailer (or "pod"). After being dispatched to Gas Town, Furiosa abruptly changes course and heads off the road, precipitating a battle in which Furiosa shows her combat and tactical skills, defending the tanker truck from scavengers and later from a party of Warboys sent out to stop her. After meeting with Max the two end up working together, drawing on their respective experiences surviving in hostile environments to overcome the challenges of fighting against Immortan Joe's forces.

Eventually, Furiosa reaches her birthplace, whereupon she is received as one of the Vuvalini of Many Mothers. In a subsequent council, Furiosa initially opts to join the Vuvalini in their trek across the salt flats to find a new home, but is persuaded to return to the Citadel by Max when he points out that it is the closest known source of water. More importantly, Max points out that with the bulk of Joe's forces engaged in pursuing Furiosa, Joe's Citadel is unlikely to be well defended against an incursion. Capitalizing on this opportunity, Furiosa leads the rag-tag group of rebels back to the Citadel, in the process engaging in a running battle with several groups of vehicles driven by the Warboys. Ultimately, Furiosa is able to board Joe's truck and slay the dictator. Upon returning to the citadel in Joe's truck, Max displays Joe's dead body, resulting in widespread admiration for Furiosa and her exploits. She is last seen ascending into the citadel on a lift used to move vehicles into and out of the facility.

Furiosa

One of the scripts completed for a Fury Road sequel was entitled Mad Max: Furiosa, and George Miller hoped to film it after the release of Fury Road. However, in a 2015 interview, Miller said:
I'm not sure, is the answer. She's not in the Mad Max [sequel] story, but in one of the stories, there's an interaction between [Max and Furiosa]. I can't really say more than that because it's still in progress.

In October 2020 it was confirmed that Anya Taylor-Joy would play a young Furiosa in the upcoming stand-alone prequel Furiosa.

Equipment

Furiosa has a mechanical left arm. Mad Max: Fury Road does not explain how Furiosa lost her arm. Furiosa drives the War Rig, a fast and powerful truck that is the main vehicle which she, Max, and the Five Wives use in their attempt to escape Immortan Joe and arrive in the Green Place. She is also armed with a handgun and an SKS rifle.

Personality
Furiosa is a strong-willed and moral leader. She takes the initiative to save the Five Wives from Immortan Joe with little regard for her own well-being and without any desire for reward, save for redemption. She aims to take the Wives to the Green Place, but when she encounters her kin, they tell her that the soil had turned to poison and nothing would grow, and it became a fetid swamp with little more than crows and mud.

Her relationship with Max inspires her to return to the Citadel and take it over after killing Immortan Joe, giving the Five Wives and all citizens a safe haven. In an interview, Charlize Theron revealed that Furiosa was originally to be a wife of the Imperator, but was infertile: "[George Miller and I] talked about backstory, about how she ended up with no arm and that she was discarded. She couldn't breed, and that was all that she was good for. She was stolen from this place, this green place that she's trying to go back to. But she was kind of embedded in [the Citadel] for one thing, and when she couldn't deliver on that one thing, she was discarded – and she didn't die. And instead... she hid out with those war pups in the world of mechanics, and they almost forgot she was a woman because she grew up like them."

Furiosa has been credited with being a positive feminist action hero. Kyle Smith of the New York Post declared that Furiosa was the true main character of Fury Road, not Max, and that she was both smarter and more adaptable than Hardy's character: "Theron's character is tough, but she's primarily a driver, not a martial-arts champion. In a scene in which Max tries to take out their pursuers with a huge gun, she turns out to be the better shot, but the reason is that she uses her head: He made the mistake of trying to fire the weapon unsupported, but she cleverly uses Max's shoulder as a tripod to stabilize it. The film doesn't pretend that Furiosa has the same muscle power as Max and the boys. But she is wily and resourceful."

Brent Walter Cline argues that an aspect of Furiosa's personality or characterization that is overlooked but just as important as her feminism is her disability: "That Furiosa should be the one to kill Immortan Joe is appropriate, given Miller's desire for a 'feminist action movie.' It's also appropriate, however, given what the film tells us about disability. The very manner of Immortan Joe's death is telling. Furiosa hooks her metal arm to his breathing mask, and then rids herself voluntarily of her prosthesis, tearing away not only Immortan Joe's mask but his face as well. For him, these things cannot be separated. Furiosa will reveal her impairment, but Immortan Joe can never, and its removal is both the metaphorical and literal end of his reign."

Reception
Furiosa's character received universal critical acclaim. Furiosa has received praise for being a strong female action heroine and bringing feminist themes to the franchise. A.O. Scott and Manohla Dargis of The New York Times said that "Mad Max, which has garnered almost $150 million domestically so far, and near unanimous critical rapture, belongs less to its titular hero than to Imperator Furiosa, the steely avenger played by Charlize Theron. Her mission is to liberate the enslaved 'wives' of the arch-villain, and she receives crucial assistance from a band of gray-haired motorcycle matriarchs."

Richard Roeper wrote for The Chicago Sun Times that "Max often takes a passenger seat to Theron's Imperator Furiosa, this is one female-empowered action vehicle." Marc Savlov of The Austin Chronicle wrote that "Furiosa, who more than lives up to her name, is Fury Roads heart and soul – well, after all those nightmarishly souped-up deathmobiles – and this future über-feminist/humanist gets all of the good lines."

Ty Burr of The Boston Globe proclaimed, "About a half hour into Mad Max: Fury Road, you may realize with a start that Max is sharing hero duties with a fiery woman warrior named Furiosa, played with tensile strength by Charlize Theron, and that Furiosa may actually be the central figure in this breakneck and emotionally resonant film. Utterly capable while yearning for 'the green place' from which she was kidnapped as a child, outfitted with a spidery mechanical arm that is one of Miller's many nods to that classic movie dystopia 'Metropolis,' Furiosa is the movie's soul and spine."

Lou Lumenick of the New York Post stated of Theron's performance and the character of Furiosa: "this spectacularly great reboot is surprisingly owned not by Hardy, who is fine, but by Charlize Theron. I wouldn't be at all surprised if Theron collected her third Oscar nomination (she won Best Actress for Monster) for her dazzling work as Imperator Furiosa, a smart, fearsome, one-armed rogue soldier bent on smuggling five women to freedom inside a gasoline truck with Max's initially reluctant help." Peter Travers of Rolling Stone said, "Hardy and Theron make a dynamite team, but this is Theron's show. She's a knockout in a sensational performance that blends grit and gravity and becomes the film's bruised heart and soul." Lawrence Toppman of The Charlotte Observer agreed, saying that "Theron stands out" in her role.

Claudia Puig of USA Today declared that Theron as Furiosa was "[t]he best female action hero since Sigourney Weaver in Alien", and added that the actress "is riveting as the clever and determined, shaved-headed Furiosa. She lends the role a fascinating blend of toughness, tenderness and gravitas as we learn her tragic back story in the film's final third."

References

External links
 Imperator Furiosa on IMDb

Mad Max (franchise) characters
Female characters in film
Film characters introduced in 2015
Fictional amputees
Fictional mechanics
Fictional mercenaries
Fictional survivalists
Fictional truck drivers
Fictional vigilantes
Fictional women soldiers and warriors